were a 1990s J-pop group whose debut single "Odoru Pompokolin" was the #1 song in 1990 on the Oricon charts, won the 32nd Japan Record Awards, was listed as the 3rd song on the JASRAC lists for 1991, and certified as a Million Record.

The three backup singers, Utoku Keiko, Watanabe Mami and Murakami Haruka, formed an offshoot group, Mi-Ke, which had several chart singles which were "produced by B. B. Queens." Utoku has also performed with B. B. Queens in later appearances.

Discography

Albums

Party (December 19, 1990)

Royal Straight B.B.Queens (July 20, 2011)

Compilation albums
SING!!〜SEGA GAME MUSIC presented by B.B.Queens (August 12, 1992)
complete of B.B.QUEENS at the BEING studio (November 25, 2002)

Singles

Other songs

See also
Being Inc.

References

Musical groups established in 1990
Musical groups disestablished in 1993
Musical groups reestablished in 2011
Musical groups disestablished in 2011
Japanese pop music groups
Being Inc. artists